Notes on the Port of St. Francis is a 1951 short impressionistic documentary film on San Francisco, directed by Frank Stauffacher, and with narration written by Robert Louis Stevenson (1882) and read by Vincent Price. The film opens with "An Epitaph" by Walter de la Mare. The film was made in 16mm film, is 22 minutes long, and has been preserved by the Pacific Film Archive at University of California, Berkeley. Stauffacher was assisted by Hy Hirsh, Allon Schoener, Herb Gleitz, and Gene Tepper. The film was co-produced by Stauffacher, the SF Maritime Museum, and the California Historical Society.

On December 18, 2013, the Library of Congress announced that this film had been selected for the National Film Registry for being "culturally, historically, or aesthetically significant".

See also
Vincent Price filmography
National Film Preservation Foundation

References

External links
Notes on the Port of St. Francis essay  by Scott MacDonald on the National Film Registry website

SF Museum of Modern Art entry
Pacific Film Archive notes (October 31, 2012)
Notes on the Port of St. Francis at  Bay Area Television Archive, San Francisco State University

1951 films
American short documentary films
United States National Film Registry films
Documentary films about San Francisco
1951 short films
1950s short documentary films
1951 documentary films
American black-and-white films
1950s English-language films
1950s American films